Victory Square may refer to the following places:

Russia and the Soviet Union

Russia

Victory Square, Saint Petersburg
Victory Square, Kaliningrad

Belarus
Victory Square, Minsk
Victory Square (Vitebsk)

Ukraine
Victory Square, Kyiv
Victory Square, Chernihiv

Kyrgyzstan
Victory Square, Bishkek

Latvia

China
 Victory Plaza, Guangzhou
 Victory Square (Dalian)

France
Place des Victoires, Paris, France
Place de la Victoire, Bordeaux, France 
Place de la Victoire, Tourcoing
Place de la Victoire, Clermont-Ferrand, France
Place de la Victoire, Ambarès-et-Lagrave, France

Other countries
Victory Square, Vancouver, Canada
Place de la Victoire in Pointe-à-Pitre, Guadeloupe
Vijay Chowk, New Delhi, India
Mohammed V Square, formerly Victory Square, Morocco
Victory Square, Nelson, New Zealand
Piłsudski Square, formerly Victory Square, Warsaw, Poland
Victory Square, Bucharest, Romania
Place de la Victoire in Tunis

See also
 Victoria Square (disambiguation)
 Trafalgar Square in London, renamed Victory Square in George Orwell's Nineteen Eighty Four